Baneins is a commune in the Ain department in the Auvergne-Rhône-Alpes region of eastern France.

Geography

Baneins occupies an area of 872 hectares 2 km west of Chatillon-sur-Chalaronne and 4 km north of Saint-Trivier-sur-Moignans with an altitude varying between 215 and 271 metres.  It can be accessed by the D17 road coming from Chatillon-sur-Chalarone in the east and continuing south-west to Chaneins.  The D66 road comes from Dompierre-sur-Chalaronne in the north, through the village and continuing south to Saint-Trivier-sur-Moignans.  The D100 road runs off the D17 in the commune and goes to Peyzieux-sur-Saône to the west. There are two hamlets in the commune: Les Bilons and Les Bages; with almost all the rest of the commune farmland with a small area of forest in the south.

The commune is traversed from south to north by the Moignans river with the Bief Savuel and the Masanand streams joining it in the commune. The Moignans joins the Chalaronne river just north of the commune.

Climate
Baneins has a humid subtropical climate (Köppen climate classification Cfa).

History
In the Middle Ages the parish was known as Athaneins but over the course of time the name Baneins, which was the name of the castle, replaced it. The etymology remains uncertain: the name Baneins is based on the German man's name Bano or Banno and the suffix -eins is very common in the Dombes area and comes from the suffix -ing which is commonly added to many Germanic names.

Baneins was a lordship before becoming Viscounty then a County under Louis XIII. The County became, with Béreins and Dompierre-sur-Chalaronne, the twelfth lordship under the sovereignty of Dombes.

Of the old castle built in the 13th century by Raoul de Baneins, a knight, who gave his name to the village, there remains no trace.

The abandonment of the name of Athaneins for Baneins was probably related to the identification of the locality to the hierarchy of the lords of Baneins.

Administration

List of Mayors of Baneins

Population

Economy

Agricultural activity is predominant in the commune. Livestock farming is still important despite a shift to grain production. The village also has a few small-scale traders (restaurant, body builder, plumber).

Culture and heritage

Sites and monuments
The Deromptey is a small hill west of the village which, on a clear day, offers extensive views - including of Mont Blanc.

The Church of St. Martin, in Romanesque style, has an apse and a portal from the 12th century. The bell tower was located above the bay of the choir but was destroyed in the French Revolution and rebuilt over the entrance. The tympanum was carved in the 19th century in honour of the patron saint of the area and is Saint Martin on horseback, dividing his cloak with a beggar kneeling and relying on a crutch.

A local lavoir (public laundry) was built in 1912.

Church of Saint Martin Gallery

Personalities
Donat Bollet (1851-1923), physician and politician, MP and senator for Ain, also Mayor of Trévoux, was born in the commune.

See also
Communes of the Ain department

Bibliography
Tourist and Archaeological riches of the Canton of Saint-Trivier-sur-Moignans, collective work, published in 2000.

External links
La Dombes and Baneins 
Baneins on Géoportail, National Geographic Institute (IGN) website 
Banneins on the 1750 Cassini Map

References

Communes of Ain
Dombes